Gyeyang may refer to:

Gyeyang District, a district of Incheon, South Korea
Gyeyang Station, a station of Incheon Subway

See also
Gyeyangsan (Mount Gyeyang), the second-highest mountain in Incheon
Kyeyang Electric, South Korean manufacturing company based Seoul, with factories in Ansan and Cheonan